is a spice mixture of four or five spices found in Vietnamese cuisine. It is named after sweet basil.

Ingredients
 typically consists of four ingredients ground into a fine powder:

 Chinese cinnamon (as opposed to Saigon cinnamon)
 Star anise
 
 Clove

Some recipes call for five ingredients, with the addition of sweet basil seeds.

Less common ingredients may include:

 Fennel
 
 Black pepper
  seeds

Usage
In northern Vietnam,  is typically used on roasted foods, such as roasted pig and crunchy coated peanuts.  and five-spice powder have similar ingredients and can be used interchangeably on meat dishes.  differs from the more well-known Cantonese blend in the portions of each ingredient, thus producing a distinct taste.

References

Vietnamese cuisine
Herb and spice mixtures